Ankasocris is a genus of moths of the family Zygaenidae, containing only one species, Ankasocris striatus. It is known from Madagascar.

References

Procridinae
Moths of Madagascar
Zygaenidae genera
Monotypic moth genera